Rebecca Scott may refer to:

 Rebecca Scott (model) (born 1972), model and Playboy Playmate
 Rebecca J. Scott, American historian
 Beckie Scott (born 1974), Canadian cross-country skier
 Rebecca Scott (Shortland Street), a character in the New Zealand soap opera Shortland Street
 Rebecca Schroeter (born Rebecca Scott, 1751–1826), English amateur musician, wife of Johann Samuel Schroeter

See also
 Rebecca Stott (born 1964), British writer
 Rebekah Stott (born 1993), New Zealand footballer